Kazantsevo is the name of several rural localities in Russia.

Altai Krai
As of 2010, four rural localities in Altai Krai bear this name:
Kazantsevo, Kuryinsky District, Altai Krai, a selo in Kuryinsky District
Kazantsevo, Romanovsky District, Altai Krai, a selo in Romanovsky District
Kazantsevo, Talmensky District, Altai Krai, a selo in Talmensky District
Kazantsevo, Zarinsky District, Altai Krai, a settlement in Zarinsky District

Chelyabinsk Oblast
As of 2009, one rural locality in Chelyabinsk Oblast bears this name:
Kazantsevo, Chelyabinsk Oblast, a village in Sosnovsky District

Krasnoyarsk Krai
As of 2009, two rural localities in Krasnoyarsk Krai bear this name:
Kazantsevo, Shushensky District, Krasnoyarsk Krai, a selo in Shushensky District
Kazantsevo, Taymyrsky Dolgano-Nenetsky District, Krasnoyarsk Krai, a settlement in Taymyrsky Dolgano-Nenetsky District

Kurgan Oblast
As of 2008, one rural locality in Kurgan Oblast bears this name:
Kazantsevo, Kurgan Oblast, a village in Chastoozersky District

Nizhny Novgorod Oblast
As of 2010, one rural locality in Nizhny Novgorod Oblast bears this name:
Kazantsevo, Nizhny Novgorod Oblast, a village in Koverninsky District

Novosibirsk Oblast
As of 2009, one rural locality in Novosibirsk Oblast bears this name:
Kazantsevo, Novosibirsk Oblast, a village in Barabinsky District

Perm Krai
As of 2009, one rural locality in Perm Krai bears this name:
Kazantsevo, Perm Krai, a village in Chernushinsky District

See also
Kazantsev

References